Cheqer or Chaqar may refer to:
 Cheqer, Golestan
 Chaqar, Markazi
 Chaqar, Razavi Khorasan

See also
Chaqar Besh Qardash
Chaqar Shir Melli